List of rivers in Amazonas (Brazilian State).

The list is arranged by drainage basin, with respective tributaries indented under each larger stream's name and ordered from downstream to upstream. Amazonas is located entirely within the Amazon Basin.

By Drainage Basin 

 Amazon River (includes Solimões)
 Tapajós River
 Juruena River
 Bararati River
 Nhamundá River
 Piratucu River
 Mamuru River
 Uaicurapa River
 Andirá River
 Paraná Urariá (Amazon and Madeira side channel)
 Maués Açu River
 Urupadi River
 Amanã River
 Paracori River
 Parauari River
 Apoquitaua River
 Paraconi River
 Abacaxis River
 Marimari River
 Canumã River
 Mapiá Grande River
 Acari River
 Camaiú River
 Sucunduri River
 Uatumã River
 Jatapu River
 Capucapu River
 Pitinga River
 Urubu River
 Madeira River
 Prêto do Igapó-Açu River
 Autaz-mirim River
 Tupana River
 Matupiri River
 Amapá River
 Luna River
 Aripuanã River
 Arauá River
 Juma River
 Roosevelt River
 Madeirinha River
 Guaribe River
 Maracanã River
 Mariepauá River
 Mataurá River
 Uruá River
 Manicoré River
 Manicorezinho River
 Jatuarana River
 Dos Marmelos River
 Maici River
 Sepoti River
 Ipixuna River
 Preto da Eva River
 Rio Negro
 Tarumã Açu River
 Tarumã Mirim River
 Cuieiras River
 Apuaú River
 Puduari River
 Curiuaú River
 Camanaú River
 Jaú River
 Carabinani River
 Unini River
 Papagaio River
 Pauini River
 Guariba River
 Arara River
 Preto River
 Jauaperi River
 Alalaú River
 Jufari River
 Caurés River
 Cuini River
 Demini River
 Araçá River
 Curuduri River
 Marari River
 Toototobi River
 Cuieiras River
 Ararirá River
 Padauari River
 Preto River
 Daraá River
 Urubaxi River
 Uneiuxi River
 Tea River
 Marauiá River
 Cauaburi River
 Maiá River
 Marié River
 Iá River
 Curicuriari River
 Uaupés River
 Papuri River
 Içana River
 Cubate River
 Cuiari River
 Aiari River
 Xie River
 Manacapuru River
 Purus River
 Jari River
 Ipixuna River
 Itaparaná River
 Jacaré River
 Tapauá River
 Cuniuá River
 Pinhuã River
 Mucum River
 Açuã River
 Umari River
 Paciá River
 Ituxi River
 Jamicia River
 Arauã River
 Ciriquiri River
 Curuquetê River
 Coti River
 Endimari River
 Sepatini River
 Tumiã River
 Mamoriá River
 Seruini River
 Pauini River
 Atucatiquini River
 Muaco River
 Inauini River
 Acre River
 Antimary River
 Andirá River
 Iaco River
 Piorini River
 Badajós River
 Mamiá River
 Coari River
 Arauá River
 Urucu River
 Itanhauá River
 Tefé River
 Japurá River
 Atiparaná River
 Mapari River
 Juami River
 Puruê River
 Traira River
 Uarini River
 Juruá River
 Mineruázinho River
 Xeruã River
 Tarauacá River
 Itucumã River
 Envira River
 Jurupari River
 Acurauá River
 Eiru River
 Gregório River
 Liberdade River
 Ipixuna River
 Jutai River
 Copatana River
 Riozinho River
 Zinho River
 Biá River
 Pati River (Bóia River)
 Mutum River
 Jutaizinho River
 Tonantins River
 Içá River
 Pureté River
 Jandiatuba River
 Javary River
 Itaquai River
 Quixito River
 Ituí River
 Curuçá River
 Pardo River
 Arrojo River
 Jaquirana River

Alphabetically 

 Abacaxis River
 Acari River
 Acre River
 Açuã River
 Acurauá River
 Aiari River
 Alalaú River
 Amanã River
 Amapá River
 Amazon River
 Andirá River
 Andirá River
 Antimary River
 Apoquitaua River
 Apuaú River
 Araçá River
 Arara River
 Ararirá River
 Arauá River
 Arauá River
 Arauã River
 Aripuanã River
 Arrojo River
 Atiparaná River
 Atucatiquini River
 Autaz-mirim River
 Badajós River
 Bararati River
 Biá River
 Camaiú River
 Camanaú River
 Canumã River
 Capucapu River
 Carabinani River
 Cauaburi River
 Caurés River
 Ciriquiri River
 Coari River
 Copatana River
 Coti River
 Cubate River
 Cuiari River
 Cuieiras River
 Cuieiras River
 Cuini River
 Cuniuá River
 Curicuriari River
 Curiuaú River
 Curuçá River
 Curuduri River
 Curuquetê River
 Daraá River
 Demini River
 Eiru River
 Endimari River
 Envira River
 Gregório River
 Guariba River
 Guaribe River
 Iá River
 Iaco River
 Içá River
 Içana River
 Inauini River
 Ipixuna River
 Ipixuna River
 Ipixuna River
 Itanhauá River
 Itaparaná River
 Itaquai River
 Itucumã River
 Ituí River
 Ituxi River
 Jacaré River
 Jamicia River
 Jandiatuba River
 Japurá River
 Jaquirana River
 Jari River
 Jatapu River
 Jatuarana River
 Jaú River
 Jauaperi River
 Javary River
 Juami River
 Jufari River
 Juma River
 Juruá River
 Juruena River
 Jurupari River
 Jutai River
 Jutaizinho River
 Liberdade River
 Luna River
 Madeira River
 Madeirinha River
 Maiá River
 Maici River
 Mamiá River
 Mamoriá River
 Mamuru River
 Manacapuru River
 Manicoré River
 Manicorezinho River
 Mapari River
 Mapiá Grande River
 Maracanã River
 Marari River
 Marauiá River
 Marié River
 Mariepauá River
 Marimari River
 Dos Marmelos River
 Mataurá River
 Matupiri River
 Maués Açu River
 Mineruázinho River
 Muaco River
 Mucum River
 Mutum River
 Rio Negro
 Nhamundá River
 Paciá River
 Padauari River
 Papagaio River
 Papuri River
 Paraconi River
 Paracori River
 Paraná Urariá
 Parauari River
 Pardo River
 Pati River (Bóia River)
 Pauini River
 Pauini River
 Pinhuã River
 Piorini River
 Piratucu River
 Pitinga River
 Preto River
 Preto River
 Preto da Eva River
 Prêto do Igapó-Açu River
 Puduari River
 Pureté River
 Puruê River
 Purus River
 Quixito River
 Riozinho River
 Roosevelt River
 Sepatini River
 Sepoti River
 Seruini River
 Sucunduri River
 Tapajós River
 Tapauá River
 Tarauacá River
 Tarumã Açu River
 Tarumã Mirim River
 Tea River
 Tefé River
 Tonantins River
 Toototobi River
 Traira River
 Tumiã River
 Tupana River
 Uaicurapa River
 Uarini River
 Uatumã River
 Uaupés River
 Umari River
 Uneiuxi River
 Unini River
 Uruá River
 Urubaxi River
 Urubu River
 Urucu River
 Urupadi River
 Xeruã River
 Xie River
 Zinho River

References
 Map from Ministry of Transport
 Rand McNally, The New International Atlas, 1993.
  GEOnet Names Server

 
Amazonas
Environment of Amazonas (Brazilian state)